USS LSM-478 was a  in the United States Navy during World War II. The ship was transferred to France as L9016 and Taiwan as ROCS Mei Kun (LSM-252).

Construction and career 
LSM-478 was laid down on 10 February 1945 at Brown Shipbuilding Co., Houston, Texas. Launched on 3 March 1945 and commissioned on 7 April 1945.

During World War II, LSM-478 was assigned to the Asiatic-Pacific theater. She was assigned to occupation service in the Far East from 4 September to 9 November 1945.

LSM-478 was decommissioned on 28 May 1946.

She was loaned to the French on 1 April 1954.

She was struck from the Navy Register.

The ship was commissioned into the French Navy on 28 June 1954 and renamed L9016. She served in the First Indochina War later that year.

L9016 was returned to the US in April 1956 and then transferred to Taiwan in November 1956, in which she was commissioned in November 1956, as ROCS Mei Kun (LSM-252). She was later redesignated LSM-352.

Underneath the cover of the night in January 1957, the ship escaped China through Kinmen and small waterways of Jinmen to avoid Communist Army's radar. At 8 in the evening, she lifted her anchor and left Liuluo Bay for Taiwan.

The ship was put out of service in 1973 with her fate unknown.

Awards 
LST-478 have earned the following awards:

American Campaign Medal
Asiatic-Pacific Campaign Medal 
World War II Victory Medal 
Navy Occupation Service Medal (with Asia clasp)

Citations

Sources 
 
 
 
 

World War II amphibious warfare vessels of the United States
Ships built in Houston
1945 ships
LSM-1-class landing ships medium
Ships transferred from the United States Navy to the French Navy
Ships transferred from the United States Navy to the Republic of China Navy